Rufus Bernhard von KleinSmid (1875 – July 9, 1964), also spelled Kleinsmidt, was the seventh president of the University of Arizona (1914–1921) and the fifth president of the University of Southern California (1921–1947).

Life and career
Von KleinSmid started his academic career at DePauw University where he was a Professor of Education and Psychology. He became USC's fifth president in 1921. A high priority of his administration was to expand professional training programs, and President von KleinSmid also presided over a building program that added nine major structures to the university campus. By the end of his first decade in office, USC had attained full national accreditation and established a graduate school to unify graduate work across the university.

USC has long considered itself a cosmopolitan school with many foreign exchange students from around the world. During the 1930s, Prince Iyesato Tokugawa worked with USC to encourage student foreign exchange programs between the U.S. and Japan. During Prince Tokugawa's 1934 visit to the United States, von KleinSmid bestowed an Honorary Doctor of Laws Degree upon the Prince for his philanthropic and educational achievements.  During that trip, Tokugawa also met with President Franklin Delano Roosevelt to discuss ways of promoting goodwill between the United States and Japan. In 1935, Roosevelt was also bestowed with an Honorary Doctor of Laws Degree. 

With the onset of the Great Depression at decade's end, USC was forced to retrench in the 1930s. During World War II, army barracks were constructed on campus, and the curriculum reflected a wartime emphasis on international relations, history, geography, languages, science and the like. Some 2,000 military trainees added to crowded conditions on campus. After the war, the lack of space at USC grew even worse, as the G.I. Bill brought former servicemen to the university for study. Enrollment soared from 15,500 in 1945 to more than 24,000 in 1947. In 1947 KleinSmid, then aged 70, elected to step down and became USC's chancellor, a position he held for the remaining seventeen years of his life.

He was recognized as "one of three of the nation's most distinguished citizens" through the National Institute of Social Sciences Gold Medal Award. On an international level, KleinSmid received awards from 20 national governments for his achievements.

KleinSmid died on July 9, 1964.

Legacy 
A passionate supporter of eugenics, which he described as "the science of good birth", and related sterilization programs, KleinSmid co-founded the Human Betterment Foundation. In 1913, he argued that "The acceptance is even now upon us, and the application of the principles of Eugenics to organized society is one of the most important duties of the social scientist of the present generation."

On June 10, 2020 USC decided to remove von KleinSmid’s name from one of its most prominent buildings, the von KleinSmid Center for International and Public Affairs.

See also
University of Southern California School of International Relations
Von KleinSmid Mansion

Notes

References
[ Past Presidents of The University of Arizona

External links
USC School of International Relations
VKC: A President's Legacy
Bust of Rufus B. von KleinSmid
The Von KleinSmid Library
USC Fencing History 
History of USC
Portrait of Rufus B. von Kleinsmid taken while walking around the USC campus, Los Angeles, 1923. Los Angeles Times Photographic Archive (Collection 1429). UCLA Library Special Collections, Charles E. Young Research Library, University of California, Los Angeles.

1875 births
1964 deaths
Presidents of the University of Arizona
Presidents of the University of Southern California
DePauw University faculty
Northwestern University alumni
American people of Dutch descent
People from Sandwich, Illinois
Burials at Forest Lawn Memorial Park (Glendale)
American eugenicists